Ọlátúnjí is both a surname and a given name of Yoruba origin meaning "a combination of prestige, success and wealth reawakened". Notable people with the name include:

Babatunde Olatunji (1927–2003), Nigerian drummer, educator, social activist
Olatunji Akin Euba (1935-2020) Nigerian composer, musicologist, and pianist
Olajide "JJ" Olatunji (born 1993), known as "KSI," English rapper and Internet personality
Eddie Olatunji Oshodi (born 1992), English footballer
Dayo Olatunji (born 1992), English singer
Ayokunle Olatunji Fatinikun (born 1991), Nigerian American player of American football
Olatunji Yearwood (born 1985), Trinidadian Soca singer and songwriter

See also
Olatunji Concert, recording of saxophonist John Coltrane

Given names of Nigerian origin
Surnames of Nigerian origin
Yoruba given names
Yoruba-language surnames
African masculine given names